Laura Rose Lopes ( Parker Bowles; born 1 January 1978) is an English art curator. She is the daughter of Queen Camilla of the United Kingdom and Andrew Parker Bowles, and the stepdaughter of King Charles III.

Biography

Early life
Laura Parker Bowles was born on 1 January 1978, the second child of army officer Andrew Parker Bowles and Camilla Shand. 

She grew up at Bolehyde Manor in Allington, and later Middlewick House in Corsham, both in Wiltshire. She and her older brother Tom were raised as Roman Catholics. Their father is Catholic, as was their paternal grandmother, Ann.

Lopes was educated at St Mary's Shaftesbury, a Catholic girls boarding school in Dorset. In the 1980s, she and her brother attended Heywood Preparatory School in Corsham. She later attended Oxford Brookes University, where she studied History of Art and Marketing.

Career
In 2001, Lopes spent three months as an intern at the Peggy Guggenheim Collection in Venice, which she said years later that she still visited when in Venice. She was Tatlers motoring correspondent in 2001 while her brother Tom was a food columnist at the same magazine. Lopes managed The Space Gallery in London's Belgravia area in the mid-2000s, and in October 2005 became a co-founding partner and gallery director of London's Eleven gallery.

Marriage and children
On 6 May 2006, she married chartered accountant Harry Marcus George Lopes, son of the Hon. George Lopes and his wife, the Hon. Sarah Astor. Harry's paternal grandparents are Massey Lopes, 2nd Baron Roborough and Helen Dawson, while his maternal grandparents are Gavin Astor, 2nd Baron Astor of Hever and Lady Irene Haig.

The wedding took place at St Cyriac's Church, an 11th-century Anglican church in Lacock, Wiltshire. Lopes wore a wedding dress by Anna Valentine, the designer known for designing her mother's dress for her wedding to the Prince of Wales in 2005. Between 400 and 500 guests attended the wedding, and more than 2000 well-wishers lined the streets after the ceremony. The reception was held at Ray Mill, the nearby estate of the bride's mother.

Lopes gave birth to a daughter, Eliza, on 16 January 2008. She gave birth to fraternal twin boys, Gus and Louis, on 30 December 2009. Eliza was a bridesmaid at the wedding of Prince William and Catherine Middleton on 29 April 2011.

References

1978 births
Alumni of Oxford Brookes University
Astor family
British art curators
British women curators
Cubitt family
Edmonstone family
English curators
English people of Canadian descent
English people of Dutch descent
English people of French descent
English people of French-Canadian descent
English people of Scottish descent
English Roman Catholics
Family of Charles III
Keppel family
Living people
Livingston family
Motoring journalists
Parker family
People educated at St Mary's School, Shaftesbury
People from Wiltshire
Shand family